Momai or Momai Mata also known as Dashamaa  a regional Hindu goddess, popular in Gujarat, especially in desert region of  Kutch.

Momai is the highest goddess of the Rabari Tribe. Sorathia group of Rabari called her as a mammai. The village Momai Mora located near Rapar in Kutch is the place where the deity is said to have first appeared, the temple is a place of pilgrimage and huge festival is celebrated here on eve of Navratri every year. She is worshiped as one of the kuldevi of Jadeja, Parmar,Sodha, Jadav and other rulers & worrier clans of erstwhile kutch State and is closely associated with the Goddess Ashapura. She is depicted as mounted on a camel, with four hands. She holds a sword and a trident in the upper right and left hand, respectively and in the lower right and left hands, she has a lotus and armor. Apart from jadeja, parmar, Sodha clan, she is worshiped by Rabari clan of Kutch, her image is found in almost every household of Rabaris. Bardai Brahmins also worship her as kuldevi. Many sub-clans of Mistris of Kutch also worship her as Kuldevi.

Dashamaa Vart 
Dashama Vrat is an annual observance for Hindu people from the state of Gujarat, which begins on the first day of Shravan month. Dashama Vrat 2022 will begin on July 28 and go on till August 7.

References

Regional Hindu goddesses
Mother goddesses
Forms of Parvati
Hindu folk deities